Barry Reed (January 28, 1927 – July 19, 2002) was an American trial lawyer and bestselling author.

Background

Barry Clement Reed was born to Clement Barry and Julia Donahue Reed in Alameda, California on January 28, 1927. He served in the U.S. Army during World War II and rose to the rank of Staff Sergeant before being honorably discharged in 1947. He earned a B.S. in 1949 from College of the Holy Cross. In 1951 he married Marie Ash. He had four children, Marie, Debbie, Barry, and Susan. He earned an L.L.B. from Boston College in 1954. He was admitted to the Massachusetts State Bar in 1955 and entered into private practice in Boston.

Reed earned a solid reputation as an attorney specializing in medical malpractice, personal injury, and civil litigation cases. For his outstanding legal work, he was honored with the Clarence Darrow Award for trial excellence. He was a past president of the Massachusetts Trial Lawyers Association, a former governor of the Massachusetts Academy of Trial Lawyers and co-founder of the American Society of Law and Medicine. One of his former law partners, Joseph Mulligan Jr., told The Boston Globe, "Mr. Reed took the greatest satisfaction out of solving legal problems for people. He did a lot of little things and never looked to get any credit or acclaim. For the small cases he just wouldn't take a fee."

In addition to his legal practice, Reed was an acclaimed author. He contributed to journals, periodicals, and newspapers, including American Bar Association Journal. After publishing two legal texts, he wrote the bestselling courtroom drama The Verdict in 1980. Stanley Ellin in The New York Times Book Review wrote that "the book, digging deep into the mysteries of medical, legal and clerical practice, has everything going for it, and makes dramatically potent use of each element." The novel centered on a down-on-his-luck lawyer who tries a malpractice case against two prominent doctors whose negligence caused a pregnant woman to go into a coma. The Verdict has been translated into a dozen languages and was adapted by David Mamet into a 1982 film, also titled The Verdict, starring Paul Newman and James Mason. The film was directed by Sidney Lumet and nominated for five Academy Awards, including best picture and best actor.

Reed's protégé was Jan Schlichtmann, a trial lawyer who became famous for his lawsuit against W. R. Grace and Company and Beatrice Foods over leukemia deaths caused by contaminated drinking water in Woburn, Massachusetts. Schlichtmann's case was the basis for  A Civil Action, which won a National Book Critics Circle Award and was made into a film starring John Travolta.

Reed died on July 19, 2002 in Norwood, Massachusetts.

Bibliography
 The Heart and the Law (1968)
 The Law and Clinical Medicine (1970)
 The Verdict (1980)
 The Choice (1991)
 The Indictment (1994)
 The Deception (1997)

References
 http://www.fantasticfiction.co.uk/r/barry-reed/
 http://galenet.galegroup.com/servlet/BioRC

External links

20th-century American lawyers
1927 births
2002 deaths
People from Alameda, California
College of the Holy Cross alumni
Massachusetts lawyers
Writers from the San Francisco Bay Area